The Chief Secretary of New South Wales, known from 1821 to 1959 as the Colonial Secretary, was a key political office in state administration in New South Wales, and from 1901, a state in the Commonwealth of Australia. During much of the 19th century, the Colonial Secretary was the pre-eminent figure in public life. The role of the Chief Secretary changed significantly from the time of its creation in 1821 to its final use in 1995, with various responsibilities changing hands. Nominally subordinate to the Governor of New South Wales from the early 19th century until the beginning of full self-government in 1856, he was effectively a government record-keeper and the officer with responsibility for the general administration of the colony. However, for most of its history the Chief Secretary was in charge of all matters relating to correspondence with government departments, naturalisation, the Great Seal, state security, censorship and classification laws, the arts (to 1975), Public Health (to 1934), Aboriginal welfare (to 1969), Lord Howe Island, and environmental protection and fisheries.

Role and responsibilities
The office of Colonial Secretary was created in 1821 to succeed the previous office of Secretary to the Governor, which had been the primary deputy to the Governor, representing the change from the absolute rule of the governor to the beginnings of self-government not only in NSW but also Australia. Originally having the role of the secretary to the Governor as well as secretary of the Colony this office was at first known as the Colonial Secretary or Principal Secretary. In 1804, Governor of New South Wales Philip Gidley King wrote that the Colonial Secretary "has the custody of all official papers and records belonging to the colony; transcribes the public despatches; charged with making out all grants, leases and other public Colonial instruments; also the care of numerous indents or lists sent with convicts of their terms of conviction, and every other official transaction relating to the Colony and Government; and is a situation of much responsibility and confidence." On 30 June 1820 Major Frederick Goulburn was commissioned as Colonial Secretary and Registrar of the Records of New South Wales, being sworn in on 1 January 1821. The role was initially an administrative role, serving as primary record-keeper and revenue collector, but also being responsible for ensuring the effective operation of government departments, for the Governor's Council and on the Legislative Council, of which they were an ex officio member.

After 1842 the Governor ceased to occupy a seat in the Legislative Council and thus the role of chief government spokesman and representative in the colonial legislature was taken up by the Colonial Secretary, thereby significantly increasing its role at a time prior to the development of the role of Premier. After the grant of full responsible government in 1856, this evolved to be a subordinate cabinet-level political position and not the role of a civil servant or government spokesman, although the office was generally held by the Premier until 1904. From 1904 the Colonial Secretary was thus a government minister and was basically equivalent to the British Home Secretary. From 1859 the Colonial Secretary was referred to as the "Colonial Secretary" or "Chief Secretary to the Government", signifying the gradual use of the tern 'Chief' rather than 'Colonial' Secretary although it would not be officially changed until 1 April 1959 under the Ministers of the Crown Act (1959).

For most of the modern role of the Chief Secretary up to its penultimate abolition in 1975, the office had responsibilities for:
The protection and welfare of the Aboriginal population.
Lord Howe Island.
Gaming, racing, betting and poker machines.
Theatre regulation and licensing.
Censorship and regulation of literature, art, films and plays.
Custody of the Great Seal.
Electoral matters
Environmental protection and fisheries.

The role was revived briefly for the period of the Willis Ministry from January to May 1976, and was revived for the last time for the period of the Liberal/National Coalition government from 1988 to 1995.

The correspondence of the Colonial Secretary has become one of the most valuable sources of information on all aspects of the history of New South Wales and the early British settlement of Australia.  Various indexes to the correspondence have been compiled, and that relating to the Moreton Bay Penal Settlement (Brisbane) and Queensland to 1860, has been developed by the State Library of Queensland.

List of Colonial and Chief Secretaries of New South Wales

Notes

External links
Colonial Secretary's papers 1822-1877, State Library of Queensland.

Colonial Secretary's letters received relating to Moreton Bay and Queensland 1822-1860. State Library of Queensland.

References

Defunct government positions of New South Wales